Dimizonops is a monotypic genus of Asian crab spiders containing the single species, Dimizonops insularis. It was first described by Reginald Innes Pocock in 1903, and is found on Socotra.

See also
 List of Thomisidae species

References

Endemic fauna of Socotra
Monotypic Araneomorphae genera
Spiders of Asia
Taxa named by R. I. Pocock
Thomisidae